Trichocercocera is a genus of flies in the family Stratiomyidae.

Species
Trichocercocera ptecticoides Lindner, 1928

References

Stratiomyidae
Brachycera genera
Taxa named by Erwin Lindner
Diptera of South America